The 1976 Pacific typhoon season has no official bounds; it ran year-round in 1976, but most tropical cyclones tend to form in the northwestern Pacific Ocean between June and December. These dates conventionally delimit the period of each year when most tropical cyclones form in the northwestern Pacific Ocean.

The scope of this article is limited to the Pacific Ocean, north of the equator and west of the international date line. Storms that form east of the date line and north of the equator are called hurricanes; see 1976 Pacific hurricane season. Tropical Storms formed in the entire west pacific basin were assigned a name by the Joint Typhoon Warning Center. Tropical depressions in this basin have the "W" suffix added to their number. Tropical depressions that enter or form in the Philippine area of responsibility are assigned a name by the Philippine Atmospheric, Geophysical and Astronomical Services Administration or PAGASA. This can often result in the same storm having two names.

Systems 

25 tropical storms formed this year in the Western Pacific. 14 storms reached typhoon intensity, of which 4 reached super typhoon strength.

Typhoon Kathy 

Typhoon Kathy was a Category 1 typhoon that stayed at sea for its whole life.

Tropical Depression Asiang 

Asiang was a Tropical Depression. It was named by PAGASA.

Tropical Depression Biring 

Biring was also named by PAGASA.

Tropical Storm Lorna 

Lorna did not affect land.

Typhoon Marie (Konsing) 

This category 4 typhoon affected the Philippines; but mostly stayed out to sea. Marie did not reach super typhoon status; but recorded a strong pressure of 930 millibars. Marie was the first category 4 of the season.

Severe Tropical Storm Nancy 

Nancy stayed at sea.

Typhoon Olga (Didang) 

The monsoon trough spawned a tropical depression east of the Philippines on May 10. It tracked generally westward, reaching tropical storm status on the 13th while remaining poorly organized. On the 14th Olga relocated to the southeast, and regained tropical storm strength after weakening. The storm headed to the northwest, and looped in response to the approach of a long wave trough. After returning to a westward movement Olga, despite unfavorable wind shear, strengthened to a typhoon on the 20th. It rapidly intensified that night, and hit eastern Luzon early on the 21st as a  typhoon. It drifted across the island, and turned northward in the South China Sea. Olga moved rapidly to the northeast, and on the 28th Olga was absorbed by a subtropical disturbance. Because of this, 374 people were killed and thousands were left homeless. Olga also destroyed many of the sets used during the filming of Apocalypse Now.

Super Typhoon Pamela 

The near equatorial trough produced a tropical depression on May 14 north of Chuuk. It moved southwestward, becoming a tropical storm on the 15th. Pamela slowly looped to the northwest, and reached typhoon status on the 16th. On the 18th and 19th, Pamela rapidly intensified to a  super typhoon, and slowly weakened as it continued its northwest movement. After slowly crossing the island, Pamela turned to the north, and weakened until becoming extratropical on the 26th. Pamela was the strongest typhoon to hit Guam since Super Typhoon Karen in 1962. Though Karen was much stronger, Pamela's slow crossing caused much more damage, amounting to $500 million (1976 USD, $1.7 billion 2005 USD). Well-executed warnings allowed for only one death in Guam. Before Typhoon Pamela hit Guam, ten people died in a landslide in Truk (Chuuk) from its heavy rains.

Tropical Depression Gloring 

Named by PAGASA

Typhoon Ruby (Huaning) 

The monsoon trough spawned Tropical Depression 7W on June 20. It headed westward, slowly organizing into a tropical storm on the 23rd. Ruby turned to the northwest, and reached typhoon strength just before hitting Luzon on the 25th. It crossed the island, weakening to a tropical storm before turning to the northeast in the South China Sea. Ruby again became a typhoon on the 28th, and on July 2, the typhoon reached a peak of  winds while south of Japan. The typhoon turned to the east, and became extratropical on the 3rd. 16 people were killed from the typhoon.

Typhoon Sally (Isang) 

Sally did not threaten land.

Super Typhoon Therese 

Typhoon Therese, which developed on July 8, explosively deepened on the 12th and 13th to a  super typhoon. Therese weakened as it continued to the northwest, and struck southwest Japan on the 19th as a tropical storm. It looped to the west, and dissipated on the 21st. Therese caused heavy flooding, killing 3 people and causing millions in damage.

Severe Tropical Storm Violet (Lusing) 

Tropical Storm Violet struck Hong Kong and Hainan Island killing 2 people.

Severe Tropical Storm Wilda 

Wilda hit Japan.

Typhoon Anita (Maring) 

Anita hit Japan.

Typhoon Billie (Nitang) 

When  Typhoon Billie hit eastern Taiwan and China, it caused heavy flooding and wind damage, amounting to 4 casualties (with 8 missing and 41 drownings) and $2.6 million in damage (1976 USD).

Severe Tropical Storm Clara 

Clara hit China.

Tropical Storm Dot (Osang) 

Dot hit China and Japan.

Tropical Storm Ellen (Paring) 

Tropical Storm Ellen struck Hong Kong killing 27 people and left 3 missing.

Super Typhoon Fran (Reming) 

An area of disturbed weather organized into Tropical Depression 17W on September 2. It tracked northwestward, becoming a tropical storm on the 4th and a typhoon on the 6th. Fran rapidly intensified to a  super typhoon on the 7th, and weakened as it turned northward. After stalling and drifting to the west, Fran continued its northward movement, hit southwestern Japan on the 12th, and became extratropical in the Sea of Japan on the 13th. The storm caused heavy flooding and wind damage, causing 133 fatalities (with 32 missing) and $572 million in damage (1976 USD, $1.9 billion in 2005 USD), the worst Japanese typhoon in over 10 years.

Tropical Storm Georgia 

Georgia moved north away from land.

Typhoon Hope 

Hope did not come near land.

Tropical Depression Seniang 

Seniang was short-lived.

Typhoon Iris (Toyang) 

Iris meandered over the South China Sea and struck South China.

Typhoon Joan 

Joan recurved east of Japan.

Typhoon Louise (Welpring) 

Louise was the strongest typhoon of the season, becoming a Super Typhoon, bringing minor impacts to the Philippines and Japan.

Typhoon Marge (Yoning) 

Marge was a strong tropical storm.

Severe Tropical Storm Nora (Aring) 

Nora brushed the Philippines.

Tropical Storm Opal (Basiang) 

Opal was a minimal tropical storm.

Tropical Depression Kayang 

The depression lasted a day.

Storm names 
Western North Pacific tropical cyclones were named by the Joint Typhoon Warning Center. The first storm of 1976 was named Kathy and the final one was named Opal.

One Central Pacific system developed, Hurricane Kate. The policy at the time was to use Western Pacific names the Central Pacific.

Philippines 

The Philippine Atmospheric, Geophysical and Astronomical Services Administration uses its own naming scheme for tropical cyclones in their area of responsibility. PAGASA assigns names to tropical depressions that form within their area of responsibility and any tropical cyclone that might move into their area of responsibility. Should the list of names for a given year prove to be insufficient, names are taken from an auxiliary list, the first 6 of which are published each year before the season starts. Names not retired from this list will be used again in the 1980 season. This is the same list used for the 1972 season. PAGASA uses its own naming scheme that starts in the Filipino alphabet, with names of Filipino female names ending with "ng" (A, B, K, D, etc.).

Season effects 
This table will list all the storms that developed in the northwestern Pacific Ocean west of the International Date Line and north of the equator during 1976. It will include their intensity, duration, name, areas affected, deaths, missing persons (in parentheses), and damage totals. Classification and intensity values will be based on estimations conducted by the JMA, however due to lack of information around this time sustained winds were recorded by the JTWC. All damage figures will be in 1976 USD. Damages and deaths from a storm will include when the storm was a precursor wave or an extratropical low.

|-
| Kathy ||  || bgcolor=#| || bgcolor=#| || bgcolor=#| || Caroline Islands ||  None ||  None ||
|-
| Asiang ||  || bgcolor=#| || bgcolor=#| || bgcolor=#| || Philippines ||  None ||  None ||
|-
| TD ||  || bgcolor=#| || bgcolor=#| || bgcolor=#| || Mariana Islands ||  None ||  None ||
|-
| Biring ||  || bgcolor=#| || bgcolor=#| || bgcolor=#| || Philippines ||  None ||  None ||
|-
| Lorna ||  || bgcolor=#| || bgcolor=#| || bgcolor=#| || Caroline Islands ||  None ||  None ||
|-
| Marie (Konsing) ||  || bgcolor=#| || bgcolor=#| || bgcolor=#| || Palau ||  None ||  None ||
|-
| Nancy ||  || bgcolor=#| || bgcolor=#| || bgcolor=#| || None ||  None ||  None ||
|-
| Olga (Didang) ||  || bgcolor=#| || bgcolor=#| || bgcolor=#| || Philippines, Ryukyu Islands ||  Unknown ||  ||
|-
| Pamela ||  || bgcolor=#| || bgcolor=#| || bgcolor=#| || Caroline Islands, Mariana Islands ||  ||  ||
|-
| TD ||  || bgcolor=#| || bgcolor=#| || bgcolor=#| || Palau ||  None ||  None ||
|-
| Gloring ||  || bgcolor=#| || bgcolor=#| || bgcolor=#| || Philippines, Ryukyu Islands ||  None ||  None ||
|-
| TD ||  || bgcolor=#| || bgcolor=#| || bgcolor=#| || None ||  None ||  None ||
|-
| Ruby (Huaning) ||  || bgcolor=#| || bgcolor=#| || bgcolor=#| || Philippines, Taiwan, Ryukyu Islands ||  Unknown ||  ||
|-
| TD ||  || bgcolor=#| || bgcolor=#| || bgcolor=#| || South China ||  None ||  None ||
|-
| Sally ||  || bgcolor=#| || bgcolor=#| || bgcolor=#| || Caroline Islands ||  None ||  None ||
|-
| Therese ||  || bgcolor=#| || bgcolor=#| || bgcolor=#| || Mariana Islands, Japan ||  Unknown ||  ||
|-
| TD ||  || bgcolor=#| || bgcolor=#| || bgcolor=#| || Caroline Islands ||  None ||  None ||
|-
| TD ||  || bgcolor=#| || bgcolor=#| || bgcolor=#| || None ||  None ||  None ||
|-
| Violet (Lusing) ||  || bgcolor=#| || bgcolor=#| || bgcolor=#| || South China ||  None ||  2 ||
|-
| Wilda ||  || bgcolor=#| || bgcolor=#| || bgcolor=#| || Japan ||  None ||  None ||
|-
| Anita (Maring) ||  || bgcolor=#| || bgcolor=#| || bgcolor=#| || Japan ||  Unknown ||  None ||
|-
| TD ||  || bgcolor=#| || bgcolor=#| || bgcolor=#| || None ||  None ||  None ||
|-
| TD ||  || bgcolor=#| || bgcolor=#| || bgcolor=#| || None ||  None ||  None ||
|-
| TD ||  || bgcolor=#| || bgcolor=#| || bgcolor=#| || Ryukyu Islands ||  None ||  None ||
|-
| TD ||  || bgcolor=#| || bgcolor=#| || bgcolor=#| || Ryukyu Islands, Taiwan ||  None ||  None ||
|-
| Billie (Nitang) ||  || bgcolor=#| || bgcolor=#| || bgcolor=#| || Taiwan, Ryukyu Islands, East China ||  ||  ||
|-
| TD ||  || bgcolor=#| || bgcolor=#| || bgcolor=#| || None ||  None ||  None ||
|-
| Clara ||  || bgcolor=#| || bgcolor=#| || bgcolor=#| || South China ||  Unknown ||  Unknown ||
|-
| TD ||  || bgcolor=#| || bgcolor=#| || bgcolor=#| || South China ||  None ||  None ||
|-
| Dot (Oyang) ||  || bgcolor=#| || bgcolor=#| || bgcolor=#| || Japan, East China, South Korea ||  None ||  None ||
|-
| Ellen (Paring) ||  || bgcolor=#| || bgcolor=#| || bgcolor=#| || Philippines, South China ||  Unknown ||  ||
|-
| TD ||  || bgcolor=#| || bgcolor=#| || bgcolor=#| || None ||  None ||  None ||
|-
| Fran ||  || bgcolor=#| || bgcolor=#| || bgcolor=#| || Mariana Islands, Japan ||  ||  ||
|-
| Georgia ||  || bgcolor=#| || bgcolor=#| || bgcolor=#| || Caroline Islands ||  None ||  None ||
|-
| TD ||  || bgcolor=#| || bgcolor=#| || bgcolor=#| || None ||  None ||  None ||
|-
| Iris (Toyang) ||  || bgcolor=#| || bgcolor=#| || bgcolor=#| || Philippines, South China ||  Unknown ||  Unknown ||
|-
| Hope ||  || bgcolor=#| || bgcolor=#| || bgcolor=#| || None ||  None ||  None ||
|-
| Seniang ||  || bgcolor=#| || bgcolor=#| || bgcolor=#| || None ||  None ||  None ||
|-
| TD ||  || bgcolor=#| || bgcolor=#| || bgcolor=#| || Mariana Islands ||  None ||  None ||
|-
| Joan ||  || bgcolor=#| || bgcolor=#| || bgcolor=#| || None ||  None ||  None ||
|-
| TD ||  || bgcolor=#| || bgcolor=#| || bgcolor=#| || None ||  None ||  None ||
|-
| TD ||  || bgcolor=#| || bgcolor=#| || bgcolor=#| || Ryukyu Islands ||  None ||  None ||
|-
| TD ||  || bgcolor=#| || bgcolor=#| || bgcolor=#| || None ||  None ||  None ||
|-
| Undang ||  || bgcolor=#| || bgcolor=#| || bgcolor=#| || Ryukyu Islands ||  None ||  None ||
|-
| Louise (Welpring) ||  || bgcolor=#| || bgcolor=#| || bgcolor=#| || Caroline Islands, Philippines ||  None ||  None ||
|-
| Marge (Yoning) ||  || bgcolor=#| || bgcolor=#| || bgcolor=#| || Caroline Islands, Ryukyu Islands ||  None ||  None ||
|-
| TD ||  || bgcolor=#| || bgcolor=#| || bgcolor=#| || Caroline Islands ||  None ||  None ||
|-
| TD ||  || bgcolor=#| || bgcolor=#| || bgcolor=#| || Philippines ||  None ||  None ||
|-
| Nora (Aring) ||  || bgcolor=#| || bgcolor=#| || bgcolor=#| || Philippines ||  Unknown ||  Unknown ||
|-
| Opal (Barang) ||  || bgcolor=#| || bgcolor=#| || bgcolor=#| || Caroline Islands ||  None ||  None ||
|-
| Kayang ||  || bgcolor=#| || bgcolor=#| || bgcolor=#| || Philippines ||  Unknown ||  Unknown ||
|-

See also 

 Pacific typhoon season
 1976 Pacific hurricane season
 1976 Atlantic hurricane season
 1976 North Indian Ocean cyclone season
 Australian region cyclone seasons: 1975–76 1976–77
 South Pacific cyclone seasons: 1975–76 1976–77
 South-West Indian Ocean cyclone seasons: 1975–76 1976–77

References

External links 
 Japan Meteorological Agency
 Joint Typhoon Warning Center .
 China Meteorological Agency
 National Weather Service Guam
 Hong Kong Observatory
 Macau Meteorological Geophysical Services
 Korea Meteorological Agency
 Philippine Atmospheric, Geophysical and Astronomical Services Administration
 Taiwan Central Weather Bureau
 Digital Typhoon - Typhoon Images and Information
 Typhoon2000 Philippine typhoon website